The XXIst Central American and Caribbean Games were held in Mayagüez, Puerto Rico from July 17, 2010 to August 1, 2010.

Results by event

Athletics

Badminton

Basketball

Handball

Bowling

Boxing

Rafting

Diving

Road Cycling

Equestrian

Fencing

Artistic Gymnastics

Trampoline Gymnastics

Judo

karate

Weightlifting

Fight

Sincronized Swimming

Swimming

Figure Skating

Water Polo

Racquetball

Taekwondo

Tenis

Table Tenis

Shot

Archery

Triathlon

Sailing

Volleyball

Beach Volleyball

See also 

Puerto Rico at the 2010 Summer Youth Olympics

References

External links

Nations at the 2010 Central American and Caribbean Games
2010
Central American and Caribbean Games